Right by You is the sixth album by American singer-songwriter Stephen Stills, released in 1984. This is his last solo recording released on a major label, and was a critical and commercial failure peaking at number 75 on the US charts. It was also his only solo album of the 1980s.

Background and recording 
In 1984, Stills re-signed with Atlantic Records to make a solo album, in which Stills embraced the 80s production sounds. Jimmy Page guested on a few tracks. It was recorded at DB Sounds, Miami, Criteria Studios, Miami, Westlake Audio, Los Angeles and Sol Studios, Berkshire, which was Jimmy Page's home studio. A music video was made for the song "Stranger." It involved Stills driving around in a speedboat, which was also pictured on the back cover of the album with Stills and Tony Garcia, the speedboat racing world champion.

Release 
The album charted at number 75 on the Billboard charts, and three singles were released: "Stranger", "Can't Let Go", and his cover of Neil Young's "Only Love Can Break Your Heart," of which only the first two charted at numbers 81 and 67 respectively.

Track listing

Charts 

Album

Singles

Personnel 
 Stephen Stills – vocals, drums (1, 2, 4, 5), percussion (1, 2, 4, 5), keyboards (2, 4, 5, 7), guitars (2, 3, 4, 6, 7, 9, 10), bass (3, 4, 5, 8), bass solo (5), backing vocals (6), arrangements 
 Lawrence Dermer – keyboards (1, 2, 4-8) bass (6), arrangements
 Mike Finnigan – keyboards (1, 2, 5-7, 8), backing vocals (1, 2, 4-9) organ (10), arrangements
 Kim Bullard – keyboards (2, 7)
 Jimmy Page – guitars (1, 3, 10)
 Bernie Leadon – guitars (3, 9), vocals (9)
 Herb Pedersen – banjo (9), backing vocals (9)
 Chris Hillman – mandolin (9), backing vocals (9)
 George "Chocolate" Perry – bass (1, 2, 5, 7, 10), guitars (4)
 Jerry Scheff – bass (9)
 Joe Galdo – drums (1-8, 10), percussion (1, 2, 4, 5), arrangements
 Joe Lala – percussion (1, 2, 5), drums (2, 5), cardboard box (9)
 John Kricker – trombone (1)
 Tony Concepcion – trumpet (1)
 Al De Gooyer – trumpet (1)
 Graham Nash – backing vocals (1, 2, 7, 8, 9)
 John Sambataro – backing vocals (1, 2, 4, 6)

Production 
 Richard Wendell – executive producer 
 Stephen Stills – producer 
 Howard Albert – producer, recording, mixing 
 Ron Albert – producer, recording, mixing 
 Steve Alaimo – associate producer, producer (6)
 Ric Butz – engineer 
 Mark Draeb – engineer 
 Stuart Epps – engineer 
 Bruce Hensal – engineer 
 Mike Fuller – mastering at Criteria Studios 
 Doug Morris – production advisor 
 Larry "Rocky" Williams – art direction, cover design, painting, back cover photography 
 Alton Kelly – cover design, painting
 Jeff Wald – personal management

The album was dedicated to Felix Pappalardi, Marvin Gaye, Dennis Wilson and J. C. Agajanian.

References

Stephen Stills albums
1984 albums
Atlantic Records albums